In mathematics, the Wronskian (or Wrońskian) is a determinant introduced by  and named by . It is used in the study of differential equations, where it can sometimes show linear independence in a set of solutions.

Definition 

That is, it is the determinant of the matrix constructed by placing the functions in the first row, the first derivative of each function in the second row, and so on through the th derivative, thus forming a square matrix.

When the functions  are solutions of a linear differential equation, the Wronskian can be found explicitly using Abel's identity, even if the functions  are not known explicitly.

The Wronskian and linear independence 

If the functions  are linearly dependent, then so are the columns of the Wronskian (since differentiation is a linear operation), and the Wronskian vanishes. Thus, the Wronskian can be used to show that a set of differentiable functions is linearly independent on an interval by showing that it does not vanish identically. It may, however, vanish at isolated points.

There are several extra conditions that ensure that the vanishing of the Wronskian in an interval implies linear dependence.

Application to linear differential equations 
In general, for an th order linear differential equation, if  solutions are known, the last one can be determined by using the Wronskian.

Consider the second order differential equation in Lagrange's notation:

where ,  are known, and y is the unknown function to be found. Let us call  the two solutions of the equation and form their Wronskian

Then differentiating  and using the fact that  obey the above differential equation shows that

Therefore, the Wronskian obeys a simple first order differential equation and can be exactly solved:

Now suppose that we know one of the solutions, say . Then, by the definition of the Wronskian,  obeys a first order differential equation:

and can be solved exactly (at least in theory).

The method is easily generalized to higher order equations.

Generalized Wronskians 

If the functions are linearly dependent then all generalized Wronskians vanish. As in the single variable case the converse is not true in general: if all generalized Wronskians vanish, this does not imply that the functions are linearly dependent. However, the converse is true in many special cases. For example, if the functions are polynomials and all generalized Wronskians vanish, then the functions are linearly dependent. Roth used this result about generalized Wronskians in his proof of Roth's theorem. For more general conditions under which the converse is valid see .

See also 
 Variation of parameters
 Moore matrix, analogous to the Wronskian with differentiation replaced by the Frobenius endomorphism over a finite field.
 Alternant matrix
 Vandermonde matrix

Notes

Citations

References 
 
 
 
 
 
 
 
 
 
 

Ordinary differential equations
Determinants
Science and technology in Poland